Club Polideportivo Cacereño is a Spanish football team based in Cáceres, in the autonomous community of Extremadura. Founded in 1919, the club plays in Segunda División RFEF – Group 5, and holds home games at Estadio Príncipe Felipe, with a capacity of 7,000 seats.

Club names
Club Deportivo Cacereño - (1919–80)
Club Polideportivo Cacereño - (1980–)

Season to season

1 season in Segunda División
18 seasons in Segunda División B
1 season in Segunda División RFEF
56 seasons in Tercera División

Current squad

Famous players
 Raúl Fabiani
 Ismael Athuman
 Ito

References

External links
Official website 
Futbolme team profile 

 
Football clubs in Extremadura
Sport in Cáceres, Spain
Association football clubs established in 1919
1919 establishments in Spain
Segunda División clubs